Kudla railway station is located on the Gawler line in the northern Adelaide locality of Kudla.

History

The station opened in 1959, and was named from an Aboriginal word meaning level ground, open or remote.

The current platform was constructed in 1961; by around 1987 the current platform shelter had been installed. It is one of the least used on the entire network, due to it being located in a semi-rural area between the suburban areas of Munno Para, Evanston and Gawler.

Services by platform

References

External links

Railway stations in Adelaide
Railway stations in Australia opened in 1959